David Atiba Charles CM (born 29 September 1977) is a Trinidadian former professional footballer who played as a defender for several clubs as well as the Trinidad and Tobago national team.

In 2006 he left W Connection to join Northern Irish club Glenavon.

He was a regular for the Trinidad and Tobago national team during his career and was included in their squad for the 2006 FIFA World Cup in Germany. Along with the other players on the 2006 World Cup squad, Charles was awarded the Chaconia Medal.

References

External links
 

1977 births
Living people
Trinidad and Tobago footballers
Association football defenders
Trinidad and Tobago international footballers
2006 FIFA World Cup players
2005 CONCACAF Gold Cup players
USL First Division players
Rochester New York FC players
W Connection F.C. players
TT Pro League players
Trinidad and Tobago expatriate footballers
Expatriate association footballers in Northern Ireland
Trinidad and Tobago expatriate sportspeople in the United States
Expatriate soccer players in the United States
Recipients of the Chaconia Medal